Abraxas subhyalinata is a species of moth belonging to the family Geometridae. It was described by Röber in 1891. It is known from Flores and Borneo.

References

Abraxini
Moths of Asia
Moths described in 1891